John Joseph Bryan (22 August 1897 – 1978) was an English professional footballer who made 75 appearances in the Football League for Lincoln City. He played as a right half.

Life and career
Bryan was born in Langwith, Nottinghamshire. He played local football in the Nottinghamshire area before joining Lincoln City towards the end of the First World War. He played in all but three senior matches in the first post-war season, as Lincoln finished 21st in the Second Division and failed to gain re-election, and missed only two as they won the Midland League title and returned to the Football League as founder members of the Third Division North. He again played all but two matches in the 1921–22 season, one of which was in goal after Robert Bainbridge missed his train to the away game at Durham City. At the end of the season he moved into the Midland League with Mansfield Town, and later played for Worksop Town and Mexborough.

Notes

References

1897 births
1978 deaths
People from Bassetlaw District
Footballers from Nottinghamshire
English footballers
Association football wing halves
Shirebrook Miners Welfare F.C. players
Lincoln City F.C. players
Mansfield Town F.C. players
Worksop Town F.C. players
Mexborough Athletic F.C. players
English Football League players
Midland Football League players
Place of death missing